Alderley Edge Methodist Church is in Chapel Road, Alderley Edge, Cheshire, England.  It is an active Methodist church.  The church and its associated hall are recorded in the National Heritage List for England as a designated Grade II listed building.

History
The church and hall were built in 1863 to a design by Hayley and Sons.  The interior of the church was re-ordered in the mid-1990s.

Architecture
The buildings are constructed in sandstone with Welsh slate roofs.  The plan of the church consists of a nave with two side chapels, and a southwest steeple.  The hall stands behind the church.  The church front facing the road is expressed as two storeys.  Both storeys contain a four-light window, the upper window being sharply pointed.  The tower is in three stages with an entrance porch on its side and a broach spire with lucarnes on its summit.  The windows are lancets, and the bell openings have two lights with louvres.  Along the sides of the church are three gabled two-light windows.  The chapel contains a rose window.  The tracery in the windows is in Decorated style.  The windows in the church hall are simpler in design.  Inside the church is a west gallery, and a pulpit and lectern, both in pitch-pine.  The two-manual organ was built in 1881 by A. Young and Sons, and renovated at a later date by Charles A. Smethurst
.

See also 

Listed buildings in Alderley Edge
 St Philip's Church, Alderley Edge

References

Grade II listed churches in Cheshire
Churches completed in 1863
Methodist churches in Cheshire
19th-century Methodist church buildings
19th-century churches in the United Kingdom